Cody Davis (born June 6, 1989) is an American football safety for the New England Patriots of the National Football League (NFL). He was signed as an undrafted free agent by the St. Louis Rams in 2013. He also played for the Jacksonville Jaguars. He played college football at Texas Tech.

Early years
Davis attended Stephenville High School in Stephenville, Texas, and he helped lead the school to a combined 33-5 record during his three years as a starter in the defensive backfield. He was named an Associated Press Class 4A Second-team All-state selection, and was voted the District 8-4A Defensive MVP after a senior season. That year, he made 109 tackles, (five for losses), 11 pass breakups and four forced fumbles.  As a junior, he was a First-team Class 4A All-State pick by both the AP and the Texas Sports Writers' Association as a junior in 2007, after making up 99 tackles, 21 pass break-ups, nine interceptions, seven forced fumbles and four fumble recoveries. He was inducted into the Stephenville High School Hall of Fame on September 26, 2014.

College career
Davis attended and  played collegiately at Texas Tech. As a senior in 2012, Davis was a 1st Team Capital One Academic All-American and was a Second-team  All-Big 12 selection for the second consecutive season after making 84 solo tackles and 101 total tackles. He finished his Texas Tech career with 49 starts, including 22 consecutive starts at safety. As a junior in 2011, he was Academic All-Big 12 (1st Team) and led team in tackles (93) while making 72 solo tackles and 21 assisted tackles. In 2010  he was All-Big 12 (Honorable Mention) and an Academic All-Big 12 (1st Team) Davis made 87 total tackles and played in 13 games (13 starts) and was second on the team with 87 total tackles while tying for the team lead (Bront Bird) with 68 solo tackles. In 2009, he was a First-team Phil Steele Freshman All-America and a Second-team  College Football News Freshman All-America. In 2008, he was a scout team member and was a redshirt.

Professional career

St. Louis / Los Angeles Rams
Davis was signed as an undrafted free agent by the St. Louis Rams on April 27, 2013, after not being drafted in the 2013 NFL Draft. He re-signed with the Rams on a two-year contract on March 9, 2016.

On November 3, 2017, Davis was placed on injured reserve after suffering a thigh injury in Week 6. He was activated off injured reserve to the active roster on December 29, 2017.

Jacksonville Jaguars
On March 15, 2018, Davis signed with the Jacksonville Jaguars.

New England Patriots
Davis signed with the New England Patriots on March 23, 2020. He was placed on injured reserve on October 5, 2020, with a ribs injury. He was activated on October 31.
In Week 13 against the Los Angeles Chargers, Davis blocked a field goal that was returned by teammate Devin McCourty for a 44 yard touchdown during the 45–0 win.

On March 19, 2021, Davis signed a new two-year deal with the Patriots worth up to $4.5 million.

In Week 6 of the 2022 season, Davis suffered a season-ending knee injury and was placed on injured reserve on October 18, 2022.

Personal life
Davis married his longtime girlfriend, Ashley Reeves, in April 2013. They have three sons.

Davis is a  Christian and an active supporter of the Fellowship of Christian Athletes.

Davis appeared as a contestant on the edition of February 24, 2017 of CBS's The Price Is Right, during Celebrity Charity Week, playing with the help of Chris O'Donnell; he was the last contestant selected from the audience to "come on down" and won $5,000 on the Punch a Bunch game.

References

External links
 New England Patriots bio
 Jacksonville Jaguars bio
 Los Angeles Rams bio
 Texas Tech Red Raiders bio

1989 births
Living people
American football safeties
New England Patriots players
Jacksonville Jaguars players
Los Angeles Rams players
People from Stephenville, Texas
Players of American football from Texas
St. Louis Rams players
Texas Tech Red Raiders football players